Olympic Palace is an indoor sports arena situated in Tbilisi, Georgia, which was built to be used as one of the venues for the 2015 European Youth Summer Olympic Festival.

Construction and facilities

Opened on 13 July 2015 by Georgia's Prime Minister Irakli Garibashvili, the complex features two halls that are capable of hosting several sports, such as handball, basketball, volleyball, judo, wrestling, futsal, fencing and other games and tournaments. The seated capacity for the Grand Hall (main arena) is 3,600 for sporting events while the smaller hall can hold 600 spectators. The Olympic Palace also includes a VIP lounge, conference and media rooms, a cafe and car parking area with space for 260 cars.

The complex was expanded with a new 10,000-seat indoor basketball arena next to the Olympic Palace and will host, in September 2022, Group A matches of EuroBasket 2022. A tunnel connects the two venues of the complex, with the arena expected to be completed by the end of May 2022. Prime Minister Garibashvili visited the new building on 11 June of that year. The palace's arena is built in line with modern standards and equipped with the latest technology. The new Sports Palace hosted the first EuroBasket test match on 4 July.

Events
The venue has hosted the 2015, 2016 and 2017 Judo Grand Prix Tbilisi. The Group A round of the UEFA Futsal Euro 2018 qualifying competition was held here from 24 to 27 January 2017. The 4th European Kung Fu Championships and the 2017 Men's Youth World Handball Championship from 8–20 August.

On 9 August 2017, the Olympic Palace was announced as the new host venue for the Junior Eurovision Song Contest 2017 after the larger capacity Tbilisi Sports Palace was considered unsuitable for hosting the contest.

References

External links

Buildings and structures in Tbilisi
Buildings and structures completed in 2015
Basketball venues in Georgia (country)
Handball venues in Georgia (country)
Indoor arenas in Georgia (country)
Sports venues in Tbilisi
Sports venues completed in 2015